This article lists various water polo records and statistics in relation to the Netherlands men's national water polo team at the Summer Olympics.

The Netherlands men's national water polo team has participated in 17 of 27 official men's water polo tournaments.

Abbreviations

Team statistics

Comprehensive results by tournament
Notes:
 Results of Olympic qualification tournaments are not included. Numbers refer to the final placing of each team at the respective Games.
 At the 1904 Summer Olympics, a water polo tournament was contested, but only American contestants participated. Currently the International Olympic Committee (IOC) and the International Swimming Federation (FINA) consider water polo event as part of unofficial program in 1904.
 Last updated: 5 May 2021.

Legend

  – Champions
  – Runners-up
  – Third place
  – Fourth place
  – The nation did not participate in the Games
  – Qualified for forthcoming tournament
  – Hosts

Number of appearances
Last updated: 5 May 2021.

Legend
 Year* – As host team

Best finishes
Last updated: 5 May 2021.

Legend
 Year* – As host team

Finishes in the top four
Last updated: 5 May 2021.

Legend
 Year* – As host team

Medal table
Last updated: 5 May 2021.

Player statistics

Multiple appearances

The following table is pre-sorted by number of Olympic appearances (in descending order), year of the last Olympic appearance (in ascending order), year of the first Olympic appearance (in ascending order), date of birth (in ascending order), name of the player (in ascending order), respectively.

Multiple medalists

The following table is pre-sorted by total number of Olympic medals (in descending order), number of Olympic gold medals (in descending order), number of Olympic silver medals (in descending order), year of receiving the last Olympic medal (in ascending order), year of receiving the first Olympic medal (in ascending order), name of the player (in ascending order), respectively.

Top goalscorers

The following table is pre-sorted by number of total goals (in descending order), year of the last Olympic appearance (in ascending order), year of the first Olympic appearance (in ascending order), name of the player (in ascending order), respectively.

Goalkeepers

The following table is pre-sorted by edition of the Olympics (in ascending order), cap number or name of the goalkeeper (in ascending order), respectively.

Last updated: 1 April 2021.

Legend and abbreviation
  – Hosts
 Eff % – Save efficiency (Saves / Shots)

Sources:
 Official Reports (PDF): 1996 (pp. 57–61, 67–68);
 Official Results Books (PDF): 2000 (pp. 58, 60–61, 79, 83–84, 89, 91).

Top sprinters
The following table is pre-sorted by number of total sprints won (in descending order), year of the last Olympic appearance (in ascending order), year of the first Olympic appearance (in ascending order), name of the sprinter (in ascending order), respectively.

* Number of sprinters (30+ sprints won, since 2000): 0
 Number of sprinters (20–29 sprints won, since 2000): 0
 Number of sprinters (10–19 sprints won, since 2000): 0
 Number of sprinters (5–9 sprints won, since 2000): 1
 Last updated: 15 May 2021.

Abbreviation
 Eff % – Efficiency (Sprints won / Sprints contested)

Source:
 Official Results Books (PDF): 2000 (pp. 58, 60–61, 79, 83–84, 89, 91).

Coach statistics

Medals as coach and player
The following table is pre-sorted by total number of Olympic medals (in descending order), number of Olympic gold medals (in descending order), number of Olympic silver medals (in descending order), year of winning the last Olympic medal (in ascending order), year of winning the first Olympic medal (in ascending order), name of the person (in ascending order), respectively. Last updated: 5 May 2021.

Ivo Trumbić won the silver medal in 1964 and Yugoslavia's first Olympic gold medal in water polo in 1968. He moved to the Netherlands in 1973, hired as the head coach of the Netherlands men's national water polo team. At the 1976 Olympics in Montreal, he led the Dutch team to win a bronze medal.

Legend
 Year* – As host team

Water polo people at the opening and closing ceremonies

Flag bearers

Some sportspeople were chosen to carry the national flag of their country at the opening and closing ceremonies of the Olympic Games. As of the 2020 Summer Olympics, three male water polo players were given the honour to carry the flag for the Netherlands.

At the 1968 Summer Olympics in Mexico City, Fred van Dorp became the first water polo player to be a flag bearer for the Netherlands at the opening and closing ceremonies of the Olympics.

After winning bronze in the men's tournament, Evert Kroon, the starting goalkeeper of the Dutch water polo team, carried the national flag of the Netherlands at the closing ceremony of the 1976 Montreal Olympics.

Four-time Olympian Ton Buunk was the flag bearer for the Netherlands during the opening ceremony at the 1984 Summer Olympics in Los Angeles.

Legend
  – Opening ceremony of the 2008 Summer Olympics
  – Closing ceremony of the 2012 Summer Olympics
  – Hosts
 Flag bearer‡ – Flag bearer who won the tournament with his team

See also
 Netherlands women's Olympic water polo team records and statistics
 List of men's Olympic water polo tournament records and statistics
 Lists of Olympic water polo records and statistics
 Netherlands at the Olympics

References

Sources

ISHOF

External links
 Netherlands men's national water polo team – Official website
 Olympic water polo – Official website

.Olympics, Men
Olympic water polo team records and statistics